Jozef Pisár (born 20 July 1971) is a former Slovak football striker who last played for the Rimavská Sobota.

External links

References

1971 births
Living people
Slovak footballers
Slovakia international footballers
Association football forwards
FC DAC 1904 Dunajská Streda players
FK Dukla Banská Bystrica players
Partizán Bardejov players
FC VSS Košice players
MŠK Rimavská Sobota players
Slovak Super Liga players
2. Liga (Slovakia) players